Sachin may refer to:

 Sachin (given name), an Indian given name, including a list of people with the name
 Sachin (actor) (born 1957), Indian actor and filmmaker
 Sachin Tendulkar (born 1973), Indian cricketer

Films
 Sachein, a 2005 Tamil film directed by John Mahendran, sometimes spelled "Sachin"
 Sachin: A Billion Dreams, a 2017 Indian biographical film of Sachin Tendulkar
 Sachin (film), a 2018 Malayalam film directed by Santhosh Nair

Places
 Sachin, Pas-de-Calais, a town in northern France
 Sachin, Gujarat, a suburban area of Surat in India
Sachin INA, a town and an industrial notified area
 Sachin railway station, a small railway station in Surat district, Gujarat
 Sachin State, a princely state of India from 1791 to 1948

See also